Joseph Magliano is a faculty member in the College of Education & Human Development (CEHD) at Georgia State University. Formerly he was Professor of Psychology and Director of the Center for the Interdisciplinary Study of Language and Literacy (CISLL) at Northern Illinois University. He has researched widely in psychology with the recent focus being on the ways in which we understand what we read and watch. In particular how our mental processes allow  comprehension and how our memories represent texts and films we have read or seen. He has also looked into ways to help identify those having difficulties reading and ways to help them improve. Magliano is the Chair of the Governing Board of the Society for Text and Discourse. Magliano is a past President of the Society for Computers in Psychology.

References

Year of birth missing (living people)
Living people
21st-century American psychologists
Georgia State University faculty